The 2014 Volta Limburg Classic was the 41st edition of the Volta Limburg Classic cycle race and was held on 5 April 2014. The race started and finished in Eijsden. The race was won by Moreno Hofland.

General classification

References

2014
2014 in road cycling
2014 in Dutch sport